Sergei Fedotov  may refer to:
 Sergei Vladimirovich Fedotov (born 1981), Russian footballer
 Sergey Fedotov (born 1972), Russian long-distance runner